The women's 4 × 100 metres relay event at the 2007 Summer Universiade was held on 9 July.

Medalists

Results

Heats
Qualification: First 3 teams of each heat (Q) plus the next 2 fastest (q) qualified for the final.

Final

References
Results

Relay
2007 in women's athletics
2007